John J. Bernhagen (March 19, 1934 – September 26, 2020) was an American politician, businessman, and farmer.

Bernhagen was born in Hutchinson, Minnesota. He graduated from Hutchinson High School in 1952. Bernhagen served in the United States Army from 1954 to 1956. He received his bachelor's degree from Metropolitan State University and his master's degree from Minnesota State University, Mankato. Bernhagen also went to University of Minnesota for graduate studies. Bernhagen was a farmer and business consultant. He served in the Minnesota House of Representatives from 1969 to 1972 and in the Minnesota Senate from 1973 to 1992. Bernhagen was a Republican. He died at his home in Hutchinson, Minnesota.

References

1934 births
2020 deaths
People from Hutchinson, Minnesota
Military personnel from Minnesota
Businesspeople from Minnesota
Farmers from Minnesota
Metropolitan State University alumni
University of Minnesota alumni
Minnesota State University, Mankato alumni
Republican Party members of the Minnesota House of Representatives
Republican Party Minnesota state senators
United States Army soldiers